Rocky Island (South) Conservation Park is a protected area in the Australian state of South Australia associated with Rocky Island which is located off the west coast of Eyre Peninsula about  west-southwest of Coffin Bay.  The conservation park was proclaimed in 1972 under the National Parks and Wildlife Act 1972 to ‘conserve New Zealand fur seal breeding areas and associated island habitat’.  The conservation park is classified as an IUCN Category Ia protected area.

References

External links
Rocky Island (South) Conservation Park webpage on protected planet

Conservation parks of South Australia
Protected areas established in 1967
1967 establishments in Australia
South Australian terrestrial protected areas with a marine zone